Toll Gate High School is a public high school in Warwick, Rhode Island on Centerville Road. It serves education to grades 9-12 and has approximately 1100 students and 97 teachers. The current timeblock for a school day is 7:24am–1:51pm.

History
The school opened in 1972 with Robert J. Shapiro as the first principal, who later became the superintendent for Warwick Schools (retiring from this position in 2007). The school's cultural arts center was dedicated in Shapiro's name in 1999.

Extracurricular activities

Athletics/Other Teams
The Toll Gate Varsity Ice Hockey team won the 2004 Rhode Island State Championship, ending the 26-year run of Mount Saint Charles Academy. Their victory is documented in the 2006 documentary film Ice Kings.

State championship titles:
Baseball: 1991 (Class A), 2001 (Class A)
Basketball (Girls'): 1973 (Class A), 1982 (Class A)
Cross Country (Boys'): 1972 (State), 1974 (Class A, State and New England), 1999 (Class B)
Golf: 1981 (State)
Ice Hockey: 1988 (Met B-1 Small), 2004 (State), 2005 (State)
Ice Hockey (Girls): 2006, 2014 (Division I-State), 2015 (DeCosta Division-State)
Indoor Track (Boys'): 2005 (Class B)
Indoor Track (Girls'): 2001 (Large Schools) 2015(Class - Medium Schools)
Soccer (Boys'): 1990 (I-B), 2014 (Division II-State)
Softball (fast-pitch): 2005-2006 (Division II)
Tennis (Boys'): 1979-1981 (Class A), 2007-2008 (Division II)
Tennis (Girls'): 1977 (Class A), 1985 (Class A), 1991 (Class A)
Unified Basketball: 2014 (State)
Unified Volleyball: 2015 (State)
Volleyball (Boys'): 1988 (Division I)
Volleyball (Girls'): 1979-1983 (Class A), 1985-1988 (Class A), 1990 (Class A), 1994 (Class A), 1997 (Class A), 1999 (Class A), 2001 (Class A)
Mock Trial Team : Rhode Island State Champions 2007, 2010, 2011, 2013
Wrestling: 2018-2019 (Division II B), 2019-2020 (Division II B)

Notable alumni
Mary Burke, Bryant Bulldogs women's basketball head coach (1991–present)
Sara DeCosta, Olympic hockey player
John Hynes, head coach of the Nashville Predators
Michaela McManus, actress
David Petrarca, director
Dave Shalansky, actor
Evan Shanley, attorney and politician
Brian Shanley, president of Providence College
David Jessen, Olympic gymnast

References

External links
Toll Gate High School

Schools in Kent County, Rhode Island
Buildings and structures in Warwick, Rhode Island
Educational institutions established in 1972
Public high schools in Rhode Island